Alexander Schmidt (born 23 October 1968) is a German former footballer and manager, who last managed Kickers Offenbach.

Coaching career
Schmidt started his coaching career as youth coach at FC Augsburg and later 1860 Munich.

In July 2012, Schmidt became head coach of 1860 Munich II and then became head coach of the first team on 18 November 2012, when Reiner Maurer was sacked. Schmidt was sacked on 31 August 2013 and temporarily replaced by Markus von Ahlen as caretaker and later by Friedhelm Funkel as permanent replacement. On 1 July 2014, Schmidt started managing Jahn Regensburg. He was sacked on 10 November 2014. He was sacked by Türkgücü München in February 2021, after starting the job in the summer of 2020.

On 26 April 2021, he took over the head coach position at Dynamo Dresden, originally only on a short contract until the end of the 2020–21 season. However, after his team won six out of seven games without conceding a single goal and secured promotion to the 2. Bundesliga, Schmidt's contract was extended until 2023. Schmidt was sacked on 1 March 2022 after seven games without a win and falling to 14th place.

In July 2022, Schmidt became head coach of Regionalliga Südwest club Kickers Offenbach but was sacked after nine games on 21 September 2022.

Managerial statistics

References

External links

1968 births
Living people
German football managers
TSV 1860 Munich managers
SSV Jahn Regensburg managers
SKN St. Pölten managers
Dynamo Dresden managers
Kickers Offenbach managers
2. Bundesliga managers
3. Liga managers
Regionalliga managers
FC Augsburg players
Sportspeople from Augsburg
Association football defenders
Footballers from Bavaria
German footballers
German expatriate football managers
Expatriate football managers in Austria
German expatriate sportspeople in Austria
FC Pipinsried players
TSV Schwaben Augsburg players